Xanthosoma caracu (yautia horqueta) is a species of edible plant described by Karl Koch and Carl David Bouché. It is native to South America and cultivated in Puerto Rico.

Description

Toxicity
The entire plant contains a toxin which requires it to be cooked before it can be safely eaten.

Uses

The corms and leaves are edible and are cultivated for food in Mexico, the Caribbean (including Puerto Rico) and northern South America. The corms are high in starch.

References

caracu
Root vegetables
Leaf vegetables
Flora of South America
Flora of Puerto Rico
Flora of Mexico
Flora without expected TNC conservation status